Chthamalus dalli, the little brown barnacle, is a species of barnacle in the family Chthamalidae. It can be found in intertidal zones along the North American Pacific coast from Alaska to San Diego.

References

Sessilia
Crustaceans described in 1916